This is a list of ancient Jains.

References

Jainism-related lists
History of Jainism
Jains